Lewinellaceae is a family of bacteria in the phylum Bacteroidota.

References

Bacteroidota
Bacteria families
Gram-negative bacteria